School 33 Art Center is an art gallery and studios in Downtown Baltimore, Maryland. Founded in 1979, it is located in a former elementary school and is run by the Baltimore Office of Promotion & The Arts. It has been considered a major non-profit exhibition spaces in Baltimore.

References

External links 
 

Museums in Baltimore
Art museums and galleries in Maryland
Government of Baltimore